Cyerce kikutarobabai is a species of sacoglossan sea slug, a shell-less marine opisthobranch gastropod mollusk in the family Caliphyllidae.

The specific name kikutarobabai is in honor of the Japanese malacologist Kikutaro Baba.

Distribution 
This species occurs in the Pacific Ocean.

References

External links 
 Sea Slug Forum info
 SlugSite info

Caliphyllidae
Gastropods described in 1976